The Saginaw and Clare County Railroad was a wholly owned subsidiary of the Flint and Pere Marquette Railroad (F&PM). It was chartered on September 4, 1877, to construct a branch line to Lake George, Michigan. On September 30, 1880, the company completed a  branch line from Harrison Junction (between Farwell and Clare along the main line) to Harrison. The line did not serve Lake George. The Saginaw & Clare County was consolidated with the F&PM on January 30, 1889.

References

External links 
Route mileage information

Railway companies established in 1877
Railway companies disestablished in 1889
Defunct Michigan railroads
Predecessors of the Pere Marquette Railway
American companies established in 1877
1877 establishments in Michigan